Sea Control Squadron 35 (VS-35), known as the Boomerangers was an anti-submarine/surface squadron of the United States Navy. Established on 3 January 1961, at Naval Air Station Los Alamitos, California, it was disestablished on 30 June 1973.

History

On establishment the squadron was equipped with eleven S2F-1 Tracker aircraft. In July 1961, the squadron transition to the S2F-3, which would later be designated the S-2D.

From August 1965 to March 1966, the squadron again deployed aboard the USS Hornet for combat operations in Vietnam. The Boomerangers maintained surface and subsurface surveillance in the Gulf of Tonkin. Later that year, they assisted the Hornet in the recovery of the first Apollo capsule. The squadron's fourth and fifth deployments in 1967 and 1968–1969 saw them return to the Gulf of Tonkin for combat operations.

In May 1973, due to impending retirement of the Grumman Tracker, VS-35 was decommissioned on June 30, 1973. A plan to reestablish a second VS-35 occurred in October 1976 to fly the S-3A Viking. This however was stopped due to fiscal constraints and in 1977, the second VS-35 was disestablished.

See also
History of the United States Navy
List of inactive United States Navy aircraft squadrons
List of United States Navy aircraft squadrons

References

GlobalSecurity: VS-35

Military units and formations in California
Sea control squadrons of the United States Navy